Scituate High School is a school located in North Scituate, Rhode Island (in Providence County). The majority of students live in the villages of Hope, Clayville and North Scituate, Rhode Island.  The official nickname of the school's athletic teams is the Spartans. According to a US News, 467 students attend Scituate High School.

This is one of the few high schools in Rhode Island to receive a GreatSchools rating of 8 out of 10.

References

External links
 
 
 Football summary at MaxPreps

Schools in Providence County, Rhode Island
Buildings and structures in Scituate, Rhode Island
Public high schools in Rhode Island